Complexe Sportif René Tys is an indoor sporting arena located in Reims, France.  The capacity of the arena is 3,000 people.  It is currently home to the Reims Champagne Basket basketball team.

Indoor arenas in France
Basketball venues in France
Buildings and structures in Reims
Sports venues in Marne (department)